Mr Gum and the Dancing Bear - the Musical! is a children's musical with book and lyrics by Andy Stanton and music by Jim Fortune, based on Stanton's children's book of the same name (as part of the Mr Gum series).

Production

National Theatre world premiere (2019) 
The musical premiered in the Dorfman Theatre at the National Theatre, London, beginning previews from 25 July with a press night on 31 July, running until 31 August 2019. The production was directed by Amy Hodge with set and costume designs by Georgia Lowe, musical direction by Tarek Merchant, lighting design by Lee Curran, choreography by Fleur Darkin, sound design by Carolyn Downing and puppetry by Jimmy Grimes. The musical is recommended for ages 7+ and runs for 2 hours (including an interval).

The production received a nomination for Best Family Show at the 2020 Laurence Olivier Awards.

Cast and characters

Critical Reception 
The musical has received five star reviews from The Stage and The Times and four star reviews from Time Out, and The Sunday Times.

Awards and nominations

References 

2019 musicals
British musicals
Musicals based on novels